al-Uddeisa, also spelled Al 'Uddeisa, is a Palestinian village located four kilometers east of Hebron.The village is a locality of Sa'ir, in the Hebron Governorate Southern West Bank. According to the Palestinian Central Bureau of Statistics, the village had a population of 1,474 in mid-year 2006. The primary health care facilities for the village are designated by the Ministry of Health as level 1.

History
In 1883 the PEF's Survey of Western Palestine found there "foundations, pillar-shafts and a large vaulted cistern. At the time, it was named Khurbet al Addeisiyeh, meaning "The ruin of the lentil-fields".

References

Bibliography

External links
Survey of Western Palestine, Map 21: IAA, Wikimedia commons 
Al-Uddeisa, part of Sa'ir,  Applied Research Institute–Jerusalem (ARIJ)

Villages in the West Bank
Hebron Governorate
Municipalities of the State of Palestine